The Jackson State Tigers and Lady Tigers represent Jackson State University, Jackson, Mississippi, in NCAA intercollegiate athletics.

Conference affiliation
Jackson State University's athletic teams participate in the Southwestern Athletic Conference (SWAC) which is a part of the NCAA Division I.  Football participates in the  Football Championship Subdivision (formerly Division I-AA).  Jackson State University's colors are navy blue and white. The nickname of the men's teams is the Tiger; the nickname of the women's teams is the Lady Tigers.

Sports

For men's teams, Jackson State University sponsors Football, Basketball, Baseball, Track, and Tennis. For women's teams, Jackson State University sponsors Basketball, Softball, Track, Tennis, Volleyball, Soccer, and Bowling.

Football

Annual Football Classics
Every late November, Jackson State plays in-state rival the Alcorn State Braves in the "Soul Bowl" (formerly the Capital City Classic).
The Tigers play their Louisiana archrival the Southern Jaguars in the popular Jackson State–Southern University rivalry (also known as the BoomBox Classic). 
The Tigers take part in the annual Southern Heritage Classic against the Tennessee State Tigers in Memphis, TN.
For the Orange Blossom Classic, Jackson State is matched against the Florida A&M Rattlers during Labor Day Weekend in Miami at the Hard Rock Stadium

Notable alumni
 Coy Bacon
 Lem Barney
 Corey Bradford
 Robert Brazile
 Louis Bullard
 Leslie "Speedy" Duncan
 Harold Jackson
 Eddie Payton
 Walter Payton
 Jackie Slater
 Jimmy Smith

Men's basketball

The Tigers have appeared in five NCAA tournaments: 1978, 1991, 1997, 2000, & 2007. As of 2015, the Tigers ranks 4th in the SWAC for number of NCAA appearances. All home games are held at the Williams Assembly Center.

Notable alumni
 Lindsey Hunter
 Trey Johnson
 Ed Manning
 Audie Norris
 Purvis Short
 Dwayne Whitfield
 Gene Short
 Cleveland Buckner
 Cornell Warner
Marcus Benard

Women's basketball

Baseball

JSU plays their home games at Braddy Field, constructed in 2006.

Notable alumni
 Oil Can Boyd
 Robert Braddy
 Wes Chamberlain
 Dave Clark
 Dewon Day
 Howard Farmer
 Mike Farmer
 Curt Ford
 Marvin Freeman
 Kelvin Moore

Golf
The men's and women's golf teams have dominated the SWAC championships. The men have won 21 championships (1989–2006, 2008–09, 2011), include 18 consecutive, and the women have won nine (1996–97, 2001, 2005–09, 2012).

Athletic traditions

Sonic Boom of the South
Often accompanying the JSU athletic teams is the university's marching band and dance line. They are nicknamed the Sonic Boom of the South and Prancing J-Settes. The band was first organized in the early 1940s. As early as the mid-1920s, the University had a well-organized orchestra. The group was given the nickname, “The Sonic Boom of the South” by band members in 1971. In 1971, the majorettes abandoned their batons and became a dance team known as the Prancing J-Settes. In 1974, “Get Ready,” an old Motown favorite was selected as the band’s theme song. Also, during the mid-1970s, the “Tiger Run-On” was perfected. The “Tiger Run-On” is a fast, eye-catching shuffle step that blends an adagio step with an up-tempo shuffle (200 steps per minute), then back to adagio—a “Sonic Boom” trademark that brings fans to their feet during halftime performances. In 2003 the marching band was in enshrined in the NCAA Hall of Champions. Also, the marching band was filmed by Electronic Art Sports (EA Sports) for inclusion in the 2005 version of the video game "EA Sports NCAA Football 2005".  The band performs at most football games and most basketball home games.

NFL Halftime appearances
 Atlanta Falcons
 Detroit Lions
 New Orleans Saints
 New York Jets
 Philadelphia Eagles
 Cincinnati Bengals
 Indianapolis Colts

Other appearances
 The 1991 NBA All-Star Game
 The Motown’s 30th Anniversary television special.
 The NAACP 34th Image Awards television special.

See also
List of black college football classics
Honda Battle of the Bands

References

External links